Thermocyclops parvus is a species of copepod in the family Cyclopidae. It is endemic to the United States, where it is known only from the Everglades in Florida.  Its natural habitat is swamps.

References

Cyclopidae
Crustaceans of the United States
Freshwater crustaceans of North America
Taxonomy articles created by Polbot
Crustaceans described in 1989